In the Battle of Zaraisk, during the Time of Troubles, on April 9, 1608, Colonel Alexander Lisovsky in service of False Dmitry II, defeated the army of Tsar Vasily IV under Zahariya Lyapunov and Ivan Khovansky.

Prelude 
Zaraysk was occupied without a fight by Lisovsky detachments (1500 Cossacks: "Lithuanian people and Russian thieves"), as the city Cossacks surrendered the city and swore to the Pretender.

Battle 
To suppress the insurrection, an army from Ryazan land came out, to which 250 elite Arzamas warriors joined. The government army carelessly besieged the fort (with no guards appointed), and the sudden sally of Lisovsky's men from the Zaraisk Kremlin scattered them with little resistance.

Aftermath 
After the victory at Zaraisk, Lisovskiy swiftly captured Kolomna, where he captured many heavy guns. His army was strengthened by the remnants of former Bolotnikovites. However, the detachment of Lisovsky, heavily burdened by the convoy, was defeated by the Tsar's army at Medvezhiy Brod.

References 

1608 in Russia
17th-century military history of Russia
1608 in Europe
Med
History of Moscow Oblast
Conflicts in 1608
Vasili IV of Russia